Wilson Lloyd Fewster ( – June 11, 2014) was a college lacrosse player and an American football, lacrosse, soccer, and wrestling coach. He coached all four of those sports at various times between 1951 and 1966 at his alma mater, Johns Hopkins University in Baltimore, Maryland. Fewster also served as the head lacrosse coach at Washington & Lee University in 1951 and the University of Virginia in 1954.

Fewster was the son of former Major League Baseball player, Chick Fewster.

Head coaching record

Football

References

1920s births
2014 deaths
American soccer coaches
Johns Hopkins Blue Jays men's lacrosse coaches
Johns Hopkins Blue Jays men's lacrosse players
Johns Hopkins Blue Jays football coaches
Virginia Cavaliers men's lacrosse coaches
Virginia Cavaliers men's soccer coaches
Washington and Lee Generals men's lacrosse coaches